is a Japanese professional basketball head coach and former player.

Head coaching record

|-
| style="text-align:left;"|Sendai 89ers
| style="text-align:left;"|2013
| 18||7||11|||| style="text-align:center;"|7th in Eastern|||-||-||-||
| style="text-align:center;"|-
|-
| style="text-align:left;"|Sendai 89ers
| style="background-color:#FFCCCC" "text-align:left;"|2016-17
| 60||14||46|||| style="text-align:center;"|6th in Eastern|||-||-||-||
| style="text-align:center;"|relegated to B2
|-

References

1971 births
Living people

Japanese basketball coaches

Sendai 89ers coaches